Lenino is a village (selo) in Lipetsky District of Lipetsk Oblast, Russia, located on the right bank of the Voronezh River.

In the 17th century peasants of boyars Romanovs founded the village (selo) of Romanovo-Gorodische. In 1614, boyar Ivan Romanov built a castle (ostrog) here, and the village became known as the town of Romanov.

In the 18th century, the town was transformed into the village of Romanovo. In 1920, it was renamed Lenino (in honor of Vladimir Lenin).

Plans exist to build a satellite town of Romanov near the south-western border of Lipetsk.

Rural localities in Lipetsk Oblast
Lipetsky Uyezd